Grand River Township may refer to the following townships in the United States:

 Grand River Township, Adair County, Iowa
 Grand River Township, Decatur County, Iowa
 Grand River Township, Madison County, Iowa
 Grand River Township, Wayne County, Iowa
 Grand River Township, Sedgwick County, Kansas
 Grand River Township, Bates County, Missouri